Mount Tuzo, previously "Peak Seven" or "Shagowa", was named in 1907 after its first ascendant, Henrietta L. Tuzo. It is located within the Valley of the Ten Peaks in the Canadian Rockies, along the Continental Divide, which forms the boundary between British Columbia and Alberta in this region. It also lies on the boundary shared by Banff National Park and Kootenay National Park.

Geology

Like other mountains in Banff Park, Mount Tuzo is composed of sedimentary rock laid down from the Precambrian to Jurassic periods. Formed in shallow seas, this sedimentary rock was pushed east and over the top of younger rock during the Laramide orogeny.

Climate

Based on the Köppen climate classification, Mount Tuzo is located in a subarctic climate zone with cold, snowy winters, and mild summers. Temperatures can drop below -20 °C with wind chill factors below -30 °C.

See also
 List of peaks on the Alberta–British Columbia border

Gallery

References

Three-thousanders of Alberta
Three-thousanders of British Columbia
Canadian Rockies
Great Divide of North America